Pedro Moncayo is a canton in the north of the Pichincha Province, Ecuador. The seat of the canton is the city of Tabacundo. The canton is named after politician Pedro Moncayo. The canton is separated by the Mojanda volcano from the canton of Otavalo in the province of Imbabura in the north. It borders the same-province cantons of Cayambe and Quito.

Cantons of Pichincha Province